As in Heaven is a 1992 Icelandic drama film directed by Kristín Jóhannesdóttir. It was screened out of competition at the 1992 Cannes Film Festival. The film was selected as the Icelandic entry for the Best Foreign Language Film at the 65th Academy Awards, but was not accepted as a nominee.

Cast
 Tinna Gunnlaugsdóttir as Mother
 Pierre Vaneck as Dr. Charcot
 Christian Charmetant as Burte
 Valdimar Örn Flygenring as Kristjan
 Sigríður Hagalín as Grand mother
 Daniel Agust Haraldsson
 Páll Óskar Hjálmtýsson
 Álfrún Örnólfsdóttir as Hrefna
 Christophe Pinon as Gonidec
 Helgi Skúlason as Grand father

See also
 List of submissions to the 65th Academy Awards for Best Foreign Language Film
 List of Icelandic submissions for the Academy Award for Best Foreign Language Film

References

External links

1992 films
1992 drama films
1990s Icelandic-language films
Films scored by Hilmar Örn Hilmarsson
Icelandic drama films